Abbas Bolaghi (also Romanized as ‘Abbās Bolāghī) is a village in Mahmudabad Rural District, in the Central District of Shahin Dezh County, West Azerbaijan Province, Iran. At the 2006 census, its population was 465, in 106 families.

References 

Populated places in Shahin Dezh County